Hurricane  High School is a public high school located in Hurricane, West Virginia, United States. It serves students in grades 9 through 12 and is one of four high schools operated by Putnam County Schools.

Academics 
HHS has above-average standardized test scores in math and reading. In 2016, Newsweek included Hurricane on its list of best high schools for low-income students.

Extracurricular activities

Athletics
Hurricane High School's sports teams are classified as AAA by the West Virginia Secondary Schools Athletic Commission, and compete in the Mountain State League. HHS athletic teams are nicknamed the Redskins, and the student section is nicknamed the Crazy Canes.

Performing arts
Hurricane's competitive marching band won state championships in 2006, 2007, and 2008. The percussion and color guard sections picked up Class B state championships in 2019.

HHS has two competitive show choirs, the mixed-gender "Red Hot" and the all-female "Heat Wave". The school has both hosted and won West Virginia state championships. The show choirs also host an annual competition in late January, entitles the Red Hot Championship.

Notable alumni 
 Doc Holliday, football player and coach
 Alex Wilson, former professional baseball player
Lauren Oyler, author and critic
Kyle Cooper, SMU Football Assistant Coach
Trey Dawson, former professional baseball player
Tyler Payne, professional baseball player

References 

Public high schools in West Virginia
Schools in Putnam County, West Virginia